Josephus Jacobus de Jager (December 9, 1912 – July 7, 2000) known as Jip de Jager, was a South African politician. He served as mayor of Bellville, Western Cape, South Africa from 1973–1975 and from 1978–1979. Outside of politics, de Jager was a German teacher in town and an advocate for bilingual education.

Early life

Jip de Jager was born on December 9, 1912 in Kareedouw, Eastern Cape South Africa, the son of Daniel Theodorus de Jager, a local businessman, and Martha Jacomina Gerber. He had two brothers Daniel Theodorus (b.1924) and Philip Alexander Johannes (b.1917).

de Jager completed his undergraduate education at Stellenbosch University in 1934, where he obtained his Bachelor's and Master's Degree in German. He later received a Bachelor's Degree and a Doctorate in Education in 1954 from the University of South Africa and Potchefstroom University for Christian Higher Education

Work life

Education field

He taught as a teacher in Kroonstad and Pretoria.

Potchefstroom University for Christian Higher Education appointed him as a lecturer.

The University of the Western Cape, gave him a professorship in education.  He retired in this position in 1975.

He was the Cape Province chairman of the South Africa Society for the promotion of Education.

Time as Mayor

Jip de Jager was elected Mayor of Bellville, Western Cape from 1973 to 1975 and again from 1978 to 1979. During his time as Mayor, de Jager established a district head office for the Police, enlarged the Magisterial district to 6000 hectares, created a tax authority within Bellville and attracted state owned enterprises like Eskom and the Council for Scientific and Industrial Research to the area. This caused Bellville to be declared a city on 7 September 1979. On that date Gene Louw handed him the papers to confirm Bellville's city status.

In between his terms as Mayor, Jip de Jager served on the Cape Provincial Council, which covered local administration of Western Cape province.

German education advocacy

In 1918 universities in South Africa started to cater for German as subject. Only a few high schools offer the subject as a third language. He researched the subject by first looking critically at the syllabus in 1946 and then drew up a study guide for the subject in 1954. In 1960 most big Afrikaans speaking high schools had German as a subject.

Books published

He was the author of multiple books, primarily on German language education in South African schools:

In 1946  he published:” 'n Kritiese ondersoek na die leerplanne en leerboeke vir Duits op die Suid-Afrikaanse skole” (Translated it means: A critical research into the study guides and syllabus of German in South African Schools)

In 1954 he published: “Die Leerboek vir Duits as derde taal aan die Suid-Afrikaanse hoërskool “. (Translated it means: The study guide for German as a third language for South African High Schools)

Personal life

He was married to Helena Claudina Nel (b. 8 April 1912, d. 17 June 2002)

Legacy

Jip de Jager Avenue in Bellville, Western Cape is named after him.

References

Stellenbosch University alumni
Academic staff of the University of the Western Cape
University of South Africa alumni
2000 deaths
1912 births